Rwanda or Ruanda is a country in East Africa.

Ruanda may also refer to:
 Ruanda (Mbeya Urban), a ward in Mbeya Urban District in southern Tanzania
 Ruanda (Mbozi), a ward in Mbozi District in southern Tanzania
 Ruanda (moth), a genus of moths in the subfamily Lymantriinae

See also
 Hotel Rwanda (2004), a film based on the Rwandan genocide in 1994